Marty O'Donnell (born February 5, 1973, in Glace Bay, Nova Scotia) is a retired boxer, who represented Canada at the 1992 Summer Olympics in Barcelona, Spain. At the Olympics, O'Donnell was defeated in the first round of the flyweight division (– 51 kg) by Australia's Robbie Peden. At the 1998 Commonwealth Games, he won a silver medal in the Featherweight division. O'Donnell turned pro and fought for the vacant Canadian Light Welterweight Title versus Mark Riggs at the Transcona Country Club in Winnipeg, Manitoba on Sunday March 17, 2002.

1992 Olympic results
Below is the record of Marty O'Donnell, a Canadian flyweight boxer who competed at the 1992 Barcelona Olympics:

 Round of 32: Lost to Robbie Peden (Australia) on points, 2-14

References
 Canadian Olympic Committee
 Profile

1973 births
Living people
Canadian people of Irish descent
Flyweight boxers
Boxers at the 1992 Summer Olympics
Olympic boxers of Canada
Boxers at the 1998 Commonwealth Games
Commonwealth Games silver medallists for Canada
People from Glace Bay
Sportspeople from the Cape Breton Regional Municipality
Canadian male boxers
Commonwealth Games medallists in boxing
Medallists at the 1998 Commonwealth Games